Lignum is Latin for wood and may refer to:

 Gmelina lignum-vitreum, plant endemic to New Caledonia
 Lignum, common name of Muehlenbeckia florulenta, plant native to inland Australia
 Lignum Crucis, remnants of the True Cross
 Lignum Ltd, see John C. Kerr
 Lignum vitae, trade wood from trees of the genus Guaiacum
 Lignumvitae Key, island in the Florida Keys
 Vitex lignum-vitae, Australian rainforest tree
 Lignum, Virginia, unincorporated community in the United States

See also
 Lignin